Events in the year 1710 in Norway.

Incumbents
Monarch: Frederick IV

Events
 August 1 –  was appointed Steward of Norway. 
  October 4 – The Dannebroge explodes and sinks at the Battle of Køge Bay in Denmark, almost all of its crew of 600 were killed, one thirds of the victims were Norwegians.
 November 24 – Francisco di Ratta and his two nephews Giuseppe di Ratta and Luigi di Ratta is given the title Marquis of Mandal.

Arts and literature

 The Lemfortstøtta monument at Stiklestad, commemorating the Battle of Stiklestad, was erected.

Births

Full date missing
Niels Egede – merchant and missionary (died 1782)

Deaths

20 February – Johan Vibe, military officer and engineer, Governor-General of Norway (b. 1637).
4 October – Iver Huitfeldt, military officer (born 1665).

See also

References